California College of Music (abbreviated CCM) is a for-profit, contemporary popular music school in Pasadena, in Los Angeles County, California. The institution was first founded in 1999 as the Pasadena International Music Academy, and changed its name to California College of Music in 2008. It currently offers six-quarter Associate of Arts degrees in music performance (voice, guitar, bass, drums, and piano/keyboards) as well as a four-quarter and two-quarter Certificate program in Music Performance and Songwriting & Music Production.

California College of Music is an accredited institutional member of the National Association of Schools of Music.

Faculty 

 Chris Kapica, Dean/ Chief Academic Officer
 Craig Pilo, drums
 Alessandro Bertoni, keyboard
 Carlos Campos, keyboard
 David Bawiec, Songwriting and Music Production co-chair
 Dom Capuano, Music Production
 Dr. Sherri Canon, Ph.D., Music History, Drums
 German Schauss, guitar
 Ben Thomas, guitar
 Chris Spilsbury, guitar
 Nick Kellie, guitar
 Benjamin Shepherd, bass guitar
 Michael Eisenstein, Songwriting
 Kia Knoester, voice

Former Faculty and Alumni 

 Phillip Ingram
 Oren Waters
 Kevin Dorsey
 Konstantin Silich
 Weba Garretson, voice
 Katya Gruzglina, voice
 Casey Sidwell, bass guitar
 Anthony Crawford, bass guitar

References

Music schools in California